The Schuyler House or General Schuyler House was built in November 1777 over 29 days for General Philip Schuyler (later Senator Schuyler, and Alexander Hamilton's father-in-law). It is now part of Saratoga National Historical Park (located 8 miles away). The British Army occupied the house during the American Revolution and burned it down upon their retreat under the command of General John Burgoyne.

After the British surrender it was rebuilt, including with salvaged glass, nails, locks and hinges recovered from the burned home. General Schuyler conducted his business affairs from the home. It was visited by George Washington, Thomas Jefferson, James Madison, the Marquis de Lafayette and President Franklin D. Roosevelt. It was given to the U.S. government. It has no electricity or running water and remains largely as it was in 1777. The home is open from late May to Labor Day.

See also
Schuyler Mansion

References

Schuyler family residences
Historic houses
Houses completed in 1777
Houses in Saratoga County, New York